The Strange Creatures is a Filipino alternative dream-pop band from the Philippines, formed in January 2013. The band currently consists of vocalist Jon Tamayo, keyboardist Megumi , bassist Bam Butalid, drummer Ryan Rillorta, and guitarists Tan Evangelista & Tobit Rubio.

History
Formerly known as “The Charmless Man and his Strange Creatures” the original group was led by singer-songwriter Jon Tamayo and Tobit Rubio.

Releases
The Strange Creatures was featured at the South East Asia (SEA Indie) and Kuala Lumpur’s TimeOut Magazine. In 2014, they have distributed their debut EP Stargazer in the UK-based Dufflecoat Records.

In April 2013, they released their first Single entitled, "Stargazer". The song became an internet hit in the Philippines and received positive reviews from several music blog sites. It was also included in SEA Indie and Manila based music blog site, Vandals On The Wall’s pan-Asian indie compilation, ERASING MEMORIES: A Vandals On The Wall x SEA Indie Mixtape.

In February 2014, they released their second single, "I Feel Like I'm On Drugs" which caught the attention of an alternative radio station in Manila (Jam 88.3) and charted in their weekly Top Ten. They were also featured in a Malaysian-based music and pop culture magazine, Time Out Kuala Lumpur. In a short period of time, the band were able to release a couple of singles. "Despite Everything" is about the struggles of a long-distance relationship, another song called "Moonstruck", like its predecessors, is well-acclaimed by listeners and critics around the music circuit. In the same year, Stargazer EP was born. It is a collection of their early songs and singles sans Moonstruck. The album is distributed by an American independent record label, Jigsaw Records, available for download in digital form

The Strange Creatures won the Wanderband 2015. By winning this competition, they were able to play the Wanderland Music Festival and share the stage with international acts such as Youngblood Hawke, The Jungle Giants, Augustana, and Kid Cudi.

In October 2018, the band had their dual album launch with Maude for their 10-track album entitled Phantasms at 19East Bar & Grill Muntinlupa. They are currently under independent record label Terno Recordings, together with some of the known bands in the country like, Up Dharma Down and Radioactive Sago Project.

Members
 Jon Tamayo – vocals, guitars
 Tobit Rubio – guitars
 Megumi Acorda – vocals, keyboards
 Tan Evangelista – guitars
 Bam Butalid – bass guitar
 John Jason Rodriguez – drums

Former Members
 Ryan Rillorta – drums
 Stephanie Coojacinto – vocals, keyboards
 Jimbo Cuenco – drums
 Aleph – vocals

Discography

Phantasms (Album) 

 Moonstruck
 Palipad Hangin
 Stargazer
 Into Serenity
 I Feel Like I'm On Drugs
 Mananatili
 Nostalgia Blues
 Dreamy Eyes
 Ocean Child
 Azure Sky

Stargazer EP 

 Stargazer
 Despite Everything
 I Feel Like I’m On Drugs
 I Don’t Want To See Your Face Again
 The Shire

Singles 
 Moonstruck (28 March 2016)
 Palipad Hangin (5 May 2016)

References

Filipino rock music groups